Rameh (alternatively spelled ar-Rame or ar-Rama) is an Arab town in the Northern District of Israel. Over half of the inhabitants are Christians, mostly Greek Orthodox and Greek Catholic, over a third are Druze and the remainder are Muslims.

A village council was established for Rameh under the British in 1922, of the first in Mandatory Palestine. Rameh's Christian and Muslim residents were temporarily expelled after its capture by Israeli forces in the 1948 Arab-Israeli War, but they returned to the village, which also became home to many internally displaced Palestinians from nearby villages. A village council was established in 1954 by the Israeli government to oversee village affairs; from 1959 on, council members were elected. As of the 1960s, the people of Rameh have been noted for their high levels of education and standards of living. The village was home to the well-known poet Samih al-Qasim, the Greek Orthodox archbishop Atallah Hanna and artist Mira Awad.

Geography and archaeology
The village is situated on an ancient site, atop a hill at the edge of Beit HaKerem Valley. To the east are remains of Roman baths, dating to the 2nd to 4th century, and oil presses from the same period. South and southeast are remains of building foundations, including an Aramaic inscription on a lintel, which indicate a 3rd to 4th-century synagogue. To the northeast of the Roman bath are the remains of a large basilica. It was excavated in 1972 and very large column bases were found, together with polychrome mosaics representing fauna and flora.

Many remains of pottery vessels dated to the Late Roman period (4th–5th centuries CE) have also been found, together with building remains from the Byzantine period.

History
Edward Robinson identifies Rameh with the ancient Ramah of Asher, citing its location and ancient sarcophagi discovered on a hill outside the village as evidence.

Ottoman era
In 1517, Rameh was with the rest of Palestine incorporated into the Ottoman Empire after it was captured from the Mamluks, and by 1596, it was a village under the administration of the nahiya ("subdistrict") of Akka (Acre), part of Safad Sanjak, with a population of 96 households, all Muslim. It paid taxes on silk spinning (dulab harir), goats, beehives, and a press that was used for processing either olives or grapes, in addition to paying a fixed, or lump sum; a total 21,986 akçe. Half of the revenue went to a waqf (religious endowment).

A map from Napoleon's invasion of 1799 by Pierre Jacotin showed the place, named as "Ramah". Rameh was entirely destroyed in the Galilee earthquake of 1837, with 180 of its inhabitants killed. The following year, Rameh was noted as Christian and Druze village in the Shaghur district, located between Safed, Acre and Tiberias. Victor Guérin visited the village in 1875, and found it to have 800 inhabitants, half Christian and half Druze.  In 1881 the PEF's Survey of Western Palestine (SWP) described it as "a village, built of stone, of good materials, containing a Greek chapel and about 600 Christians and 500 Druzes; it is situated in plains, with large olive-groves, gardens and vineyards; five perennial springs near the village, and several cisterns in it." A population list from about 1887 showed that Rameh had about 1,125 inhabitants; 575 Muslims, 425 Druze and 125 Greek Catholics.

British Mandatory period
Under the British Mandatory administration in Palestine, a municipal council was established for Rameh on 15 October 1922. In the 1922 census of Palestine, Rameh had a total population 847; 624 Christians, 195 Druze and 28 Muslims. Among the Christians, 474 were Greek Orthodox, 47 Roman Catholics, 102 Greek Catholic (Melkites) and one Maronite. The population increased in the 1931 census to 1,142 residents living in 254 houses. The religious breakdown of the population was 746 Christians, 326 Druze and 70 Muslims.

In the 1945 statistics Rameh had a population of 1,690; 1,160 Christians, 440 "others"(Druze), and 90 Muslims. with 24,516 dunams of land, according to an official land and population survey. Of this, 8,310 dunams were plantations and irrigable land, 3,078 used for grains, while 56 dunams were built-up land.

State of Israel

Rameh was captured by Israeli forces from the Golani Brigade without resistance on 30 October 1948 following Operation Hiram. Another Israeli unit entered the village during the next day and expelled 1,000 of its Muslim and Christian inhabitants on the threat of death, though the Druze were allowed to remain. The historian Benny Morris surmises that the expulsion order may have been driven by local Druze pressure to expel Rameh's Christians or a punitive response to the public support from one of Rameh's leading Christian notables, Father Yakub al-Hanna, for Fawzi al-Qawuqji, the leader of the Arab Liberation Army (ALA), one of the principal Arab forces in the Galilee during the 1948 Arab-Israeli war. The Israeli unit departed the village on 5 November and Rameh's expelled residents returned to the village after having camped out in the surrounding wadis (dry river beds) and caves. Their return was likely enabled by the intervention of the Israeli officer Ben Dunkelman of the 7th Brigade, who protested the expulsion order. Many Christians expelled from the captured village of Iqrit settled in Rameh.

In 1954 a local council was appointed to administer Rameh's local affairs. Members of the 13-council were elected for the first time in 1959. In 1989 Fathinah Hana was elected head of Rameh's local council, one of three Arab women elected heads of municipal or local councils in Israel, the other two being Samiyah Hakhim in Nazareth and Nahidah Shehadeh in Kafr Yasif; before them, only one Arab woman in Israel had been elected to the position, Violet Khoury of Kafr Yasif in 1979–1988.

Demography
53% of the residents of Rameh are Christian, 31% are Druze and 16% are Muslim.

Writing in the 1960s, the historian Jacob Landau noted that Rameh was "distinguished by its high level of education and standard of living, expressed in the home, dress and general behaviour". At the time at least, the Greek Orthodox community was the largest religious group in the village and held the most influence over its local affairs, followed by the Greek Catholics (Melkites). The Druze maintained significant numbers in Rameh, but were politically divided at the time into two factions, while the smaller Christian communities, namely the Roman Catholics, and the Muslims, most of whom were internally displaced refugees from nearby villages, wielded little political influence. The Druze of Rameh are generally known to be the "least traditionally minded [Druze] in Israel", according to the historian Robert Betts.

Notable people

In alphabetical order by surname, article excluded:
 Mira Awad (born 1975), singer, actress, and songwriter
 Angelina Fares (born 1989), gymnast, 2007 Miss Israel beauty pageant contestant and subject of "Lady Kul El-Arab" documentary film; born in Rameh
 Basel Ghattas (born 1956), politician, Balad party, member of the Knesset (2013–2015-...)
 Archbishop Theodosios (Hanna) of Sebastia (born 1965), clergyman, Greek Orthodox Patriarchate of Jerusalem
 Reem Kassis, Palestinian culinary writer whose father was from Rameh
 Hanna Mwais (1913–1981), politician, member of the Knesset for Hadash (1977–1981)
 Elias Nakhleh (1913–1990), politician, member of the Knesset (1959–1974)
 Samih al-Qasim (1939–2014), poet of Palestinian Druze descent

See also
Arab localities in Israel

References

Bibliography

 

 

 

 

 
 (p. 341)

External links
Welcome To al-Rama
Survey of Western Palestine, Map 4:   IAA, Wikimedia commons 
Rame, Dov. Gutterman
 Best Olive Oil in the world NYT on Rameh history and oil 
 Khalaf Olives from Rameh Khalaf Olives Deep History

Arab localities in Israel
Druze communities in Israel
Arab Christian communities in Israel
Local councils in Northern District (Israel)